To Live and Die in Alabama is a 2021 documentary film, directed by Matt Kay. It focuses on the circumstances leading to the 2004 arrest and controversial 2020 execution of Nathaniel Woods and the killings for which he was convicted. The film was aired on FX on December 3, 2021, and was made available on Hulu shortly after. A month later, it was released for free on the New York Times' website. The film is a part of the New York Times Presents documentary series.

Synopsis 
Nathaniel Woods was convicted of capital murder in the killings of three police officers in Birmingham, Alabama. Despite never pulling a trigger, Woods was accused by the state of being an accomplice to the shooter, Kerry Spencer.

The film features interviews from Woods, Spencer, family members of Woods and the deceased officers, and others involved in the case. Woods's family believes in his innocence, while opinions from family members of the deceased officers are mixed; Kimberly Chisholm Simmons, the sister of deceased officer Harley Chisholm III, defends Woods in the documentary and believes in his innocence, while Andrea Elders, the daughter of deceased officer Carlos Owen, believes Woods was "the whole entire reason" that the murders occurred.

Cast 
All star as themselves.

△ = Believes Woods is guilty〇 = Believes Woods is innocent

 Nathaniel Woods (archival footage)
 Chris McAlpine, juror △
 Christina Bishop, alternate juror 〇
 Michael Blalock, defense counsel for Kerry Spencer 〇
 Rita Briles, defense counsel for Nathaniel Woods 〇
 Tyran "Bubba" Cooper, Woods's cousin 〇
 Curtis Crane, juror △
 Andrea Elders, daughter of deceased officer Carlos Owen △
 Annetta Nunn, Birmingham police chief (2003-2007) △
 Kimberly Chisholm Simmons, sister of deceased officer Harley Chisholm III 〇
 Kerry Spencer, shooter 〇
 Cynthia Umstead, defense counsel for Nathaniel Woods 〇
 Deandrez Walters, son of Nathaniel Woods 〇
 Nathaniel Woods Sr., father of Nathaniel Woods 〇
 Heavenly Woods, sister of Nathaniel Woods 〇
 Pamela Woods, sister of Nathaniel Woods 〇

References 

American documentary films
Hulu original programming
2021 documentary films
2021 films
2020s English-language films
2020s American films